Steven Howard Hoffman (born December 1951) is an American mastering engineer.

Biography

In the early 1970s, Hoffman worked in radio and earned a degree in mass communications from California State University, Northridge. During the late 1970s, Hoffman joined MCA Records as catalog research and development coordinator. For the next decade, he was responsible for compiling hundreds of budget cassette releases for MCA's Special Products division. His primary focus was on jazz and big band recordings.

In 1985 he worked on a series of releases aimed at the CD market which bore the title "From the Original Master Tapes." This series included works of artists such as Buddy Holly, Bill Haley and John Coltrane. He was later fired from MCA, and has plied his trade with the Dunhill Compact Classics and Audio Fidelity labels, owned by Marshall Blonstein, former vice president of Ode Records.

Steve Hoffman co-wrote and recorded as a musician (drums and guitar) the surf rock instrumental "Cecilia Ann" with childhood friend Charles "Frosty" Horton, under the moniker of The Surftones. The track was recorded to provide an opener for a sixties surf rock anthology assembled by Hoffman in 1989, and gained popularity when it was covered by the Pixies, also as an opener on their 1990 album Bossanova.

Approach
The adjustments Hoffman makes depend on the quality of the tape source and the equalization choices of the mixing engineer. While he avoids noise reduction, he does add subjective "colorations" through subtractive equalization and up to five layers of vacuum tube distortion.

The Picks' overdubs
In February 1984, Hoffman sent what are known as safety copies of several Buddy Holly master recordings to John Pickering of The Picks who took them to Sound Masters studios in Houston, Texas. There, the reunited group overdubbed  new vocal parts onto at least 60 recordings, and sent them back to Hoffman at MCA. The belief was that, under Hoffman's influence, MCA would have issued these "new" recordings as an album, perhaps to commemorate the 25th year since Holly's death. This did not occur, and Hoffman was subsequently fired from MCA. In 1992, Pickering approached Viceroy Records to arrange a deal for nationwide distribution of these overdubbed recordings, but MCA made it clear that Pickering did not have legal clearance to release such recordings.

References

External links
Steve Hoffman Website
In Search of the Holy Hi-Fi Grail JazzTimes, March 2007. 

1951 births
Living people
American audio engineers
20th-century American Jews
Mastering engineers
21st-century American Jews